Eggon (also Egon, Ero, or Mo Egon), erroneously referred to as Mada - formerly a Plateau language spoken in central Nigeria. It is one of the major language in Nasarawa State.

Classification
The exact classification of the Eggon language has been in dispute and it can be said that this issue remains unresolved. Eggon was first classified by Greenberg (1963) as a Plateau language in his group 5, together with Nungu and Yeskwa. In the revision prepared by Carl Hoffman published in Hansford et al. (1976) a Benue group was set up that combined Greenberg's Plateau 5 and 7 with Jukunoid. The new subgrouping classified Eggon together with Nungu, Ake and Jidda-Abu. This concept of a Benue grouping came from the lexicostatistical studies of Shimizu (1975) who argued against the unity of Greenberg's Plateau and proposed the Benue group. However, in 1983, Gerhardt published a convincing rebuttal of Shimizu's arguments. The latest version of classification of Plateau languages in Gerhardt (1989) adds Yashi to the Eggon subgroup but removes the links with 'Benue' i.e. Tarok and the Jukunoid languages. Blench (2008) classifies Eggon and Ake as the Eggonic group of the Southern branch of Plateau.

Distribution 
The main towns of the Eggon people are Eggon, Kagbu, Washo and Wana. They stretch as far south as Lafia and west of Akwanga as far as the railway line. They are bordered on the north by the Mada and to the south by the Migili and the Idoma.

In much of the colonial literature, the Eggon were known as the "Hill Mada" in contrast to the "Plains Mada", the people known as Mada today. The Eggon lived in the Mada hills south of Akwanga in the pre-colonial period, but there is no connection between the groups that would justify these terms, and they have now been discarded.

The exact number of speakers is unknown, but it is unlikely to be less than the estimate of 200,000 given by Sibomana (1985). Ames (1934) gave a figure of 41,276 for the 1920s, but this is likely to have been substantially underestimated. Welmers (1971) estimated 52,000 although this may have been only a projection from Ames.

Very little has been written about Eggon society and Temple (1922) and Ames (1934) are the only sources that contain any descriptions of Eggon social organisation.

Dialects
Eggon is conventionally divided into twenty-five mutually comprehensible dialects, some of which are; Eggon Wangibi, Ikka, Wana, Washo, Wakama, Ogne, Angbashu, Alushi, Alogani, Eva, Nabe, Lizzi, Ezzen, Arikpa, etc. The only author to discuss dialects is Sibomana (1985) whose discussion focuses on Kagbu, which he states is the main dialect. He also cites data from the Eggon dialect. The Benue–Congo Comparative Wordlist (1969, 1972) also gives data from two dialects.

A twenty-sixth variety is Madan-tara, spoken by a group of Eggon east of Eggon. It is said to be impossible to understand without special learning and is sufficiently different from other lects to be effectively a new language. Its precise relationship to the other varieties of Eggon is unknown.

Phonology
Unlike the surrounding languages, Eggon has many consonant clusters that had historically developed via vowel deletion.

Written language

Eggon has no literary standard language. The earliest written material in Eggon appears to be scripture portions from 1937, probably prepared by I.D. Hepburn. The dialect chosen for bible translation is based on the Wana dialect, although it is supplemented by forms from other dialects and so is a sort of synthetic Eggon not based on the speech of a particular group. A hymnbook and 2 readers were prepared, and the translation of the New Testament was completed in 1974. The orthography of the New Testament is somewhat different from the earlier publications. There are however, literature works written in eggon language which provides confidence for one to surely say there is improvement in the written language of eggon. There are also summer lessons to teach and train eggon sons and daughters their language and culture.

Eggon is apparently in use in churches only in remoter regions and it has been displaced by Hausa in all establishments along the main road. However, there is apparently a move to revive the use of Eggon. Some evidence of this is the recent publication of new material in Eggon, a book of history and customs and a women's magazine which is intended to make a regular appearance.

Bibliography
The following are the main things that have been written about Eggon. Some have not been published and are only available in mimeo.

 Ames, C.G. (1934 new ed. 1972) Gazetteer of The Plateau Province (Nigeria) Jos Native Administration.
 Gerhardt, L. (1983) The classification of Eggon: Plateau or Benue group? JWAL, 13:37-50.
 Ludzi, T. (1981) The syntax of Eggon B.A. Essay, Department of English, University of Jos.
 Maddieson, I. (1972) The Benue–Congo languages of Nigeria Mimeo, Ibadan.
 Maddieson, I. (n.d.) Verb-nominal contraction in Eggon Mimeo, Ibadan.
 Maddieson, I. (n.d.) The Noun-class system of Eggon Mimeo, Ibadan.
 Maddieson, I. (1982) Unusual consonant cluster and complex segments in Eggon Studies in African Linguistics, Supplement 8:89-92.
 Sibomana, L. (1985) A phonological and grammatical outline of Eggon Afrika und Übersee, 68:43-68.
 Welmers, W.E. (1971) Checklist of African Language and Dialect Names in CTL7:759-900. Ed. T.A. Sebeok. Mouton, The Hague.

References

Nigeria: Situation of the Eggon ethnic group, including treatment by society, armed groups and state authorities (2011-June 2016) https://refworld.org/docid/5843f9124.html
Joshua Project. N.d. "Eggon in Nigeria." https://joshuaproject.net/people_groups/11721/NI
Liman, Sa'adatu Hassan and Abubakar S.I. Wakawa. January 2012. Muslims of Nasarawa State: A Survey. Nigeria Research Network (NRN), Oxford Department of International Development, Oxford University. 
Nasarawa State. N.d. "Languages of Nasarawa State." 
Professor of history, Obafemi Awolowo University, Nigeria. 30 May 2016. Correspondence with the Research Directorate.
 A dictionary of Eggon, edited by Roger Blench (in preparation)

External links
Excerpts from "A dictionary of Eggon", edited by Roger Blench

Languages of Nigeria
South Plateau languages